Wei Guangtao (November 27, 1837 – March 15, 1916), courtesy name Wuzhuang was a Chinese politician who was the Governor of Xinjiang, Viceroy of Yun-Gui, Viceroy of Shaan-Gan, Viceroy of Liangjiang, and Viceroy of Min-Zhe. He was also notable for his military service during the First Sino-Japanese War and Dungan Revolt.

Biography
Wentong worked in the Jiangxi military camp to choose from Jiupin in 1859. In 1860, Guangtao was sent to Cheng County regardless of double single month selection with employment under Lan Ling. In 1861, Guangtao was selected for prestigious county selection and from 1861 until 1863 as a Hualing. In 1863, Guangtao decided to stay Zhejiang for supplementary use. He was exempt from the class in 1864 but still stayed and made up the time by producing vaccines. In 1865, Guangtao followed Taoist beliefs and in 1866, spent his time working in salt transport. In 1867, Guangtao was promoted to Circuit Officer and nominated for first class. In 1883, he was appointed the chief ambassador of Gansu from 1884-1885. Guangtao would then begin to be assigned to be viceroy of several viceroys across China as starting from 1889-1892 he was chief ambassador of Xinjiang, then to Viceroy of Jiangxi in 1896, Viceroy of Yun-Gui from 1900 to 1902, Governor of Shaanxi from 1900, Viceroy of Liangjiang from December 5, 1902 – September 4, 1904 and finally as Viceroy of Min-Zhe from  1904 to 1905. He was supposed to be Viceroy of Huguang in 1911 but was never assumed office.

During the First Sino-Japanese War, Wei Guangtao, then the Xinjiang feudal commander, led the Wuwei Army's 6th Battalion with 3,300 people in the Battle of Niuzhuang. With the aid of Li Guangjiu, the Japanese army was outnumbered for a whole day and night, and the remaining troops broke through.

Family
His grandson Wei Rongje was a Chinese scientist, academician of Chinese Academy of Sciences and a professor at Nanjing University.

References

Bibliography
From the Founding of Sanjiang Normal University to Wei Guangtao and Li Ruiqing Wei Rongjue
Zhao Weixi. From Frontier Officials to Frontier Officials: A Biography of Wei Guangtao. Beijing: China Social Sciences Press. 2018. 

1837 births
1916 deaths
Qing dynasty generals
Generals from Hunan
Politicians from Hunan
Military leaders of the Taiping Rebellion
Chinese military personnel of the First Sino-Japanese War